St. John's College (York) F.C. was an English football club based in York.

History
The club joined the Yorkshire Football League in 1970, and spent seven seasons in the competition – all of them in the bottom Third Division.

References

Defunct football clubs in England
Yorkshire Football League
Defunct football clubs in North Yorkshire